Marion Township is one of the eleven townships of Hocking County, Ohio, United States. As of the 2010 census the population was 2,463.

Geography
Located in the northern part of the county, it borders the following townships:
Rush Creek Township, Fairfield County - north
Jackson Township, Perry County - northeast corner
Monday Creek Township, Perry County - east 
Falls Township (northeastern portion) - southeast, between Monday Creek and Green townships
Green Township - southeast
Falls Township (southwestern portion) - south
Good Hope Township - southwest
Berne Township, Fairfield County - west

It is the most northerly township in Hocking County.

No municipalities are located in Marion Township.

Name and history
It is one of twelve Marion Townships statewide.

Government
The township is governed by a three-member board of trustees, who are elected in November of odd-numbered years to a four-year term beginning on the following January 1. Two are elected in the year after the presidential election and one is elected in the year before it. There is also an elected township fiscal officer, who serves a four-year term beginning on April 1 of the year after the election, which is held in November of the year before the presidential election. Vacancies in the fiscal officership or on the board of trustees are filled by the remaining trustees.

References

External links
County website

Townships in Hocking County, Ohio
Townships in Ohio